The Laredo Morning Times is a daily newspaper publication based in Laredo, Texas, USA. It is owned by the Hearst Corporation.

References
Odie Arambula, Laredo Morning Times, June 14, 2006.

External links

Laredo Morning Times
Official mobile website
Hearst subsidiary profile of the Laredo Morning Times
Zapata Times

Daily newspapers published in Texas
Mass media in Laredo, Texas
Hearst Communications publications
Newspapers established in 1892
1892 establishments in Texas